was a Japanese statesman, courtier, general and politician during the Nara period. The third son of Fujiwara no Fuhito, he founded the Shikike ("Ceremonials") branch of the Fujiwara clan.

Career
He was a diplomat during the reign of Empress Genshō;  and he was minister during the reign of Emperor Shōmu. In the Imperial court, Umakai was the chief of protocol (Shikibu-kyō).

Kibi no Makibi and the Buddhist monk Genbō were also part of the entourage.
 724 (Jinki 1, 1st month): Umakai led an army against the emishi; but this military campaign was later judged to have been unsuccessful.
 729 (Tenpyō 1): The emperor invested Umakai with the power to raise an army to quash a revolt, but the cause for alarm was dissipated without the need for military action.
 737 (Tenpyō 9): Umakai died at age 44.  A major smallpox epidemic caused the deaths of Umakai and his three brothers.

Genealogy
This member of the Fujiwara clan was son of Fujiwara no Fuhito.  Umakai had three brothers: Muchimaro, Fusasaki, and Maro. These four brothers are known for having established the "four houses" of the Fujiwara.

Umakai's children included: Fujiwara no Hirotsugu and Fujiwara no Momokawa

Family
Father: Fujiwara no Fuhito
Mother: Soga no Shōshi (蘇我娼子, ?–?), daughter of Soga no Murajiko (蘇我連子).
Wife: Isonokami no Kunimina no Ōtoji (石上国盛), daughter of Isonokami no Maro (石上麻呂).
1st son: Fujiwara no Hirotsugu (藤原広嗣, ?–740)
2nd son: Fujiwara no Yoshitsugu (藤原良継, 716–777)
Wife: Takahashi no Aneko (高橋阿禰娘), daughter of Takahashi no Kasa no Ason (高橋笠朝臣).
3rd son: Fujiwara no Kiyonari (藤原清成, 716–777)
Wife: unclear name (小治田功麿男牛養女)
5th son: Fujiwara no Tamaro (藤原田麻呂, 722–783)
Wife: Kume no Wakame (久米若女), daughter of 久米奈保麻呂?
8th son: Fujiwara no Momokawa (藤原百川, 732-779)
Wife: named (佐伯家主娘), daughter of 佐伯徳麻呂.
9th son: Fujiwara no Kurajimaro (藤原蔵下麻呂, 734–775)
Children with unknown mother:
4th son: Fujiwara no Tsunate (藤原綱手, ?–740)
Daughter: name unknown, wife of Fujiwara no Uona.
Daughter: name unknown, wife of Fujiwara no Kosemaro (藤原巨勢麻呂).
Daughter: named (掃子), possibly mother of Fujiwara no Tsunatsugu (藤原綱継).

Notes

References
 Brinkley, Frank and Dairoku Kikuchi. (1915). A History of the Japanese People from the Earliest Times to the End of the Meiji Era. New York: Encyclopædia Britannica. OCLC 413099
 Nussbaum, Louis-Frédéric and Käthe Roth. (2005).  Japan encyclopedia. Cambridge: Harvard University Press. ;  OCLC 58053128
 Titsingh, Isaac. (1834).  Annales des empereurs du Japon (Nihon Odai Ichiran).  Paris: Royal Asiatic Society, Oriental Translation Fund of Great Britain and Ireland. OCLC 5850691

Fujiwara clan
694 births
737 deaths
People of Asuka-period Japan
People of Nara-period Japan
Japanese ambassadors to the Tang dynasty
Deaths from smallpox
Infectious disease deaths in Japan